Daly's Club, with premises known as Daly's Club House, was a gentlemen's club in Dublin, Ireland, a centre of social and political life between its origins in about 1750 and its end in 1823.

History

Daly's had its origins in a Chocolate House, established in about 1750 at numbers 1–3 Dame Street, Dublin, later described as "the only society, in the nature of club, then existing in the Irish metropolis". The establishment was much frequented by members of the Parliament of Ireland. In the 1760s, a group of gentlemen who met there constituted themselves as a club, which was said to be named after Henry Grattan's friend Denis Daly (1748–1791). In some ways this came to resemble White's in St James's Street, London, both in importance and exclusivity.

In 1787, the blackballing of William Burton Conyngham from political motives led to an exodus of members from Daly's, who in the shape of the Kildare Street Club formed a new club which soon rivalled Daly's as a fashionable haunt.

In 1790 a number of members of Daly's who were also members of the Irish Parliament paid for a new clubhouse at number 3, College Green, close to the Irish Houses of Parliament. The new premises, designed by Francis Johnston, stretched from Anglesey Street to Foster Place and were opened with a grand dinner on 16 February 1791. With marble chimneypieces, white and gold chairs and sofas covered with aurora silk, the new clubhouse was superbly furnished.

Daly's Club reached the height of its notability after its arrival at College Green. It was one of the venues for meetings of the Irish Hell Fire Club, which met variously at Montpelier Lodge on Montpelier Hill, at the Eagle Tavern on Cork Hill near Dublin Castle, or at Daly's on College Green.

In 1794, The European Magazine and London Review declared: 

However, after the Union with Great Britain of 1800 put an end to the Irish Parliament by creating the United Kingdom of Great Britain and Ireland, the Club fell into a decline and was eclipsed by the Kildare Street Club. Daly was followed as manager of the Club by Peter Depoe, who continued in office until 1823, when the Club was closed. By 1841, the Club was described in the Edinburgh magazine as "the once-celebrated, and still well-remembered, "Daly's Club" ".

After the Club's demise, the novels of Charles Lever, such as Charles O'Malley: The Irish Dragoon and The Knight of Gwynne: a Tale of the Time of the Union, gave it a reputation for melodramatic romance.

In Charles O'Malley, Lever gives an impression of the impact of the Club's closure: 

In 1866, Charles Dickens alluded to the fate of the Club in his All the Year Round: 

While much of the building has been demolished, part of the remains are now occupied by a coffee shop and offices at 2-4 College Green.

Notable members
John Philpot Curran
Henry Flood
Charles Kendal Bushe
William Conyngham Plunket, 1st Baron Plunket
Henry Grattan
Sir Hercules Langrishe, 1st Baronet
George Ponsonby

Notes

Bibliography
R. E. Brooke, Daly's Club and Kildare Street Club (Dublin: 1930)

See also
Kildare Street Club

Organisations based in Dublin (city)
Politics of pre-partition Ireland
Gentlemen's clubs in Ireland
Demolished buildings and structures in Dublin
Hotels in Dublin (city)
Georgian architecture in Ireland